Federico Chirico (born 13 May 1989) is a former Italian football defender.

Caps on Italian Series 

Serie C2 : 5 Caps

External links
 

Living people
Footballers from Rome
1989 births
Italian footballers
Association football defenders
S.S. Lazio players
S.F. Aversa Normanna players
Serie C players